Dave Holby (born 25 December 1980) is a British indoor rowing endurance world record holder. On 18 December 2010 he became the first person to row the virtual distance around the earth's equator (40,075 km) on a Concept2 land rowing machine, setting a new Guinness World Record of 934 days. The record appears in the 2013 Guinness Book of World Records. He has raised over £40,000 for a number of charities, chiefly Breakthrough Breast Cancer. In May 2011, he was awarded the Mayor's Medal for his contribution to the borough of Basingstoke and Deane. In November 2012 he became Patron of Support through Sport UK, a national charitable trust that aims to use sport to change people's lives.

Holby's completion of endurance challenges to raise funds for a number of charities has so far seen him set nineteen world and three British indoor rowing records:

April 2015 – Lightweight British record in the tandem 30–39 age category for fastest 100 km row (7 hours 26 mins), co-rowed with Paul Smith
March 2015 – Lightweight world record in the small team male 30–39 age category for endurance rowing (31 hours), co-rowed with The Naomi House Rowing Challenge Team
March 2015 – Lightweight world record in the small team male 30–39 age category for furthest 24-hour row (251.386 km), co-rowed with The Naomi House Rowing Challenge Team
March 2015 – Lightweight world record in the small team male 30–39 age category for fastest 100 km row (8 hours 58 mins), co-rowed with The Naomi House Rowing Challenge Team
March 2015 – Lightweight world record in the tandem 30–39 age category for endurance rowing (31 hours), co-rowed with Paul Smith
March 2015 – Lightweight British record in the tandem 30–39 age category for furthest 24-hour row (257.661 km), co-rowed with Paul Smith
March 2015 – Lightweight British record in the tandem 30–39 age category for fastest 100 km row (8 hours 39 mins), co-rowed with Paul Smith
October 2014 – Heavyweight world record in the large team mixed 19 and under age category for endurance rowing (31 hours 55 mins), co-rowed with The Wells Tobias Rowing Challenge Team
October 2014 – Heavyweight world record in the small team mixed 20–29 age category for endurance rowing (25 hours), co-rowed with The Wells Tobias Rowing Challenge Team
October 2014 – Heavyweight world record in the small team male 20–29 age category for furthest 24-hour row (310.632 km), co-rowed with The Wells Tobias Rowing Challenge Team
October 2014 – Heavyweight world record in the small team male 20–29 age category for fastest 100 km row (6 hours 42 mins), co-rowed with The Wells Tobias Rowing Challenge Team
March 2014 – Lightweight world record in the tandem 20–29 age category for endurance rowing (32 hours), co-rowed with Mike Bridges
March 2014 – Lightweight world record in the tandem 20–29 age category for furthest 24-hour row (320.332 km), co-rowed with Mike Bridges 
August 2012 – Heavyweight world record in 30–39 category for longest continual individual row (50 hours) 
December 2010 – World record for fastest solo row around the earth's equator (40,075 km)
May 2010 – Heavyweight world record in the tandem 20–29 age category for endurance rowing (103 hours), co-rowed with Ollie Trinder
May 2010 – Heavyweight world record in the tandem 20–29 age category for fastest million metre row (102 hours 32 mins), co-rowed with Ollie Trinder
April 2010 – World record for most metres rowed in a single season (17,111,960 metres)
November 2009 – Lightweight world record in 20–29 category for longest continual individual row (30 hours) 
October 2009 – Lightweight world record in the 20–29 age category for fastest million metre individual row (227 hours 43 mins)
July 2009 – Heavyweight world record in the tandem 20–29 age category for furthest 24-hour row (312.726 km), co-rowed with James Burrows 
May 2009 – Heavyweight world record in the tandem 20–29 age category for fastest 100 km row (7 hours 29 mins), co-rowed with Jonathan James Holby

References

British male rowers
Living people
1980 births
Place of birth missing (living people)